Alexander Haure Turvelin (born 1847, date of death unknown) was a United States Navy sailor and a recipient of the United States military's highest decoration, the Medal of Honor.

Sometime during that month, while Trenton was at Toulon, France, Coxswain Augustus Ohlensen fell overboard and, because he could not swim, began to sink. Turvelin and another sailor, Ordinary Seaman John Davis, jumped into the water and rescued Ohlensen from drowning. For this action, both he and Davis were awarded the Medal of Honor three and a half years later, on October 18, 1884.

Turvelin's official Medal of Honor citation reads:
For jumping overboard from the U.S.S. Trenton, at Toulon, France, February 1881, and rescuing from drowning Augustus Ohlensen, coxswain.

Details of his later life and burial are unknown.

See also

List of Medal of Honor recipients during peacetime

References

External links
 

1847 births
Year of death missing
Emigrants from the Russian Empire to the United States
United States Navy sailors
United States Navy Medal of Honor recipients
Foreign-born Medal of Honor recipients
Non-combat recipients of the Medal of Honor